Adrian Hooke (died January 7, 2013)  was an aerospace telecommunications engineer, and a cofounder of the Consultative Committee for Space Data Systems.

Biography 
Adrian Hooke held a B.Sc in Electronic and Electrical Engineering from the University of Birmingham, England.

He worked on the Apollo program and other NASA programs as a young engineer.  In 1982, he cofounded the Consultative Committee for Space Data Systems (CCSDS), an international consortium of space agencies, and remained active in the organization until 2012.  Hooke helped develop standards published by the CCSDS, including the Space Communications Protocol Specifications (SCPS). He was involved in the Interplanetary Internet and Delay Tolerant Networking efforts to bring more computer networking into NASA telecommunications.

Awards 
 NASA Exceptional Service Medal (twice)
 NASA Exceptional Achievement Medal
 Special CCSDS Lifetime Leader Award, 2012

References 

Astronautics
Consultative Committee for Space Data Systems
Telecommunications engineers
Electronics engineers
2013 deaths